Ecuador competed at the 1992 Summer Olympics in Barcelona, Spain. Thirteen competitors, six men and seven women, took part in fifteen events in six sports.

Competitors
The following is the list of number of competitors in the Games.

Athletics

Men's 10.000 metres
Edy Punina
 Heat — 30:19.76 (→ did not advance)

Men's Marathon
 Rolando Vera — 2:21.30 (→ 43rd place)

Men's 20 km Walk
Jefferson Pérez — did not finish (→ no ranking)

Women's 3.000 metres
Janeth Caizalitín
 Heat — 9:32.29 (→ did not advance)

Women's 10.000 metres
Martha Tenorio
 Heat — 34:29.03 (→ did not advance)

Women's 10 km Walk
Miriam Ramón
 Final — 51:56 (→ 36th place)

Women's 400m Hurdles
Liliana Chalá
 Heat — 58.55 (→ did not advance)

Cycling

Two male cyclists represented Ecuador in 1992.

Men's road race
 Juan Carlos Rosero

Men's 1 km time trial
 Nelson Mario Pons

Judo

 María Cangá

Shooting

 Hugo Romero

Swimming

Women's 100m Breaststroke
 Priscilla Madero
 Heat — 1:20.76 (→ did not advance, 40th place)

Women's 200m Breaststroke
 Priscilla Madero
 Heat — 2:46.79 (→ did not advance, 35th place)

Table tennis

Women's Singles Competition
 María Patricia Cabrera

See also
 Ecuador at the 1991 Pan American Games

References

External links
Ecuador Olympic Committee

Nations at the 1992 Summer Olympics
1992
Olympics